Major-General Sir Herbert Mullaly  (4 June 1860 – 9 June 1932) was an officer in the British Army.

Mullaly was born in British India, the son of John Mullaly of the East India Company and his wife, Hannah. He was baptised in Bombay at three months old. Major-General Mullaly saw service in South Africa, was Director of Military Operations in India from 1906 to 1910, and was in charge of East Coast defences during the war.

He served in British India, South Africa and during World War I in England, where he commanded the Thames and Medway Defences.

He authored Russia's March towards India. By An Indian Officer (London; Sampson Low, Marston & Company 1894).

He was appointed a Companion of the Order of the Bath (CB) in 1905, a Companion of the Order of the Star of India (CSI) in 1908, and Knight Commander of the Order of St Michael and St George (KCMG) in 1917. He died in La Tour-de-Peilz, Switzerland in 1932.

His portraits can be found in the National Portrait Gallery.

Papers
Major-General Sir Herbert Mullaly left his decorations, papers, and textbooks in his will to his son, Major Brian Reginald Mullaly, of the Indian Army, with this comment:"Among them are many original papers, such as original copies of the schemes for the redistribution and reorganisation of the army in India, which were called 'Lord Kitchener Schemes,' but which were evolved entirely out of my own brain, written by my own hand, and were accepted practically in their entirety." The papers also include various other documents of a confidential nature. General Mullaly requested that none of his diaries or papers, or extracts therefrom, be published before 1950.

References

1860 births
1932 deaths
British Indian Army generals
Knights Commander of the Order of St Michael and St George
Companions of the Order of the Bath
Companions of the Order of the Star of India